John Martin McNiven (born 23 December 1962) is a Scottish retired football midfielder who made over 470 appearances in the Scottish League, most notably for Stranraer and Queen's Park. He also played for Ayr United, Alloa Athletic, Clyde and Stenhousemuir.

Honours 
Queen's Park
 Scottish League Second Division: 1980–81

References

Scottish footballers
Scottish Football League players
Queen's Park F.C. players
Association football midfielders
1962 births
Footballers from Glasgow
Clyde F.C. players
Ayr United F.C. players
Stranraer F.C. players
Alloa Athletic F.C. players
Stenhousemuir F.C. players
Living people